The Kabuki Warriors were a Japanese professional wrestling tag team consisting of Asuka and Kairi Sane. They are former one-time and longest reigning WWE Women's Tag Team Champions and have headlined the TLC: Tables, Ladders & Chairs event in December 2019.

History

Women's Tag Team Champions (2019–2020) 
After spending some weeks away to promote the movie Fighting with My Family, retired wrestler Paige made a backstage appearance on the 9 April 2019 episode of SmackDown, where she announced that she would be bringing a new tag team to the division to feud with The IIconics (Billie Kay and Peyton Royce) for their Women's Tag Team Championship. A week later, Paige introduced the newly formed team of Asuka and Kairi Sane, known as "The Kabuki Warriors", who subsequently made their debut as a team by teaming with Bayley and Ember Moon to defeat The IIconics and the team of Mandy Rose and Sonya Deville. Kabuki Warriors would then pick up wins over local wrestlers on the April 30 episode of SmackDown and the team of Rose and Deville on the May 14 SmackDown, before beginning a feud with IIconics over the Women's Tag Team Championship throughout the summer. After defeating IIconics at live events in Tokyo on June 28, Kabuki Warriors received an opportunity against IIconics for the Women's Tag Team Championship on the July 16 episode of SmackDown which they won by count out however, the IIconics retained their titles.

On the August 5 episode of Raw, the Kabuki Warriors participated in a fatal four-way elimination tag team match for the Women's Tag Team Championship but were the last ones eliminated by Alexa Bliss and Nikki Cross. They unsuccessfully challenged Bliss and Cross for the titles on the August 12 episode of Raw. Kabuki Warriors received another title shot against Bliss and Cross at the Hell in a Cell event, where the Kabuki Warriors won the Women's Tag Team Championship, after Asuka used green mist on Cross, thus showing signs of a villainous turn. Kabuki Warriors were then drafted to the Raw brand on the October 14 episode of Raw. They solidified their status as villains on the October 28 episode of Raw by turning on their manager by Paige when Asuka spat mist into Paige's face and thus ending their association with Paige.

The Kabuki Warriors retained the Women's Tag Team Championship against Dakota Kai and Tegan Nox on the October 30 episode of NXT and Becky Lynch and Charlotte Flair on the November 11 episode of Raw. At Survivor Series, the Kabuki Warriors represented Raw in the 5-on-5-on-5 women's elimination match against Team SmackDown and Team NXT, which Team NXT won. Asuka turned on her teammate Charlotte Flair by spitting green mist on her, causing Flair to get eliminated, which led to Kabuki Warriors beginning a feud with Lynch and Flair. Kabuki Warriors successfully defended the Women's Tag Team Championship against Lynch and Flair, Alexa Bliss and Nikki Cross and Bayley and Sasha Banks in a fatal four-way match at Starrcade. Kabuki Warriors continued their feud with Lynch and Flair, which led to them defending the titles against Lynch and Flair in the namesake main event of the TLC: Tables, Ladders & Chairs event, which Kabuki Warriors retained. This led to Asuka entering a feud with Lynch in 2020 over the latter's Raw Women's Championship, which Asuka failed to win in subsequent matches at the Royal Rumble and the February 10 episode of Raw.

Kabuki Warriors would then begin feuding with Alexa Bliss and Nikki Cross, which led to a match between the two teams at WrestleMania 36, where Kabuki Warriors lost the titles back to Bliss and Cross. They unsuccessfully challenged Bliss and Cross for the titles in a rematch on the April 10 episode of SmackDown.

Asuka's Raw Women's Championship reign (2020) 
On the April 13 episode of Raw, Asuka defeated Ruby Riott to qualify for the women's Money in the Bank ladder match while Kairi Sane lost to Nia Jax in a qualifying match. Asuka went on to win the match at the namesake event, thus winning the women's Money in the Bank contract which allowed her to cash in for a future title shot at the time and place of her choosing. The following night on Raw, Asuka was awarded the Raw Women's Championship by former champion Becky Lynch, who gave the title to Asuka due to her pregnancy, which led to Asuka embracing Lynch and it resulted in Kabuki Warriors turning into fan favorites. Kabuki Warriors then began feuding with Sasha Banks and Bayley as Banks and Asuka fought to a no contest at The Horror Show at Extreme Rules after Bayley interfered and counted the pinfall for Banks though Banks was not recognized as champion. On the July 27 episode of Raw, Sane was viciously attacked by Bayley backstage during the Raw Women's Championship match between Asuka and Sasha Banks which led to Asuka running to the backstage area where she was counted out and lost the title. This was done to write Sane out of the storylines as she announced her departure from WWE on Twitter as she was heading back to Japan to be with her husband, effectively disbanding The Kabuki Warriors.

Championships and accomplishments 
 Pro Wrestling Illustrated
 Ranked No. 9 of the top 50 Tag Teams in the PWI Tag Team 50 in 2020
 WWE                                                                                                                                                                               
 WWE Raw Women's Championship (1 time) – Asuka
 WWE Women's Tag Team Championship (1 time)
 Money in the Bank (Women's 2020) – Asuka
 WWE Year-End Award for Women's Tag Team of the Year (2019)

References

External links 
 
 

Women's wrestling teams and stables
WWE teams and stables